Spin Boldak is a district in the eastern part of Kandahar Province, Afghanistan. It borders Daman District to the west, Arghistan District to the north, Qila Abdullah District of Pakistan to the east and Shorabak District to the south. The population was estimated at 100,400 in 2006. The district center is the town of Spin Boldak, located in the western part of the district on the road to Pakistan.

On 21 November 2009, five Afghan Border Force members were killed by a roadside bomb. On the same day, according to a Taliban spokesman, a district police commander was also killed. At least 100 people were killed in a mass shooting in 2021 by the Taliban.

References

External links

Afghan Border Police station open for 24-hour operations in Spin Boldak, by Staff Sgt. Brendan Mackie, Combined Task Force Arrowhead (July 17, 2012)
AIMS District Map

Districts of Kandahar Province